Isoaulactinia is a genus of cnidarians belonging to the family Actiniidae.

The species of this genus are found in Central America.

Species:

Isoaulactinia hespervolita 
Isoaulactinia stelloides

References

Actiniidae
Hexacorallia genera